is a Japanese manga series written and illustrated by Ritz Kobayashi. The story revolves around a first-year high school girl named Saki Miyanaga who is brought into the competitive world of mahjong by another first-year, Nodoka Haramura. The manga has been serialized in Square Enix's Young Gangan since February 3, 2006 and is licensed in English by Yen Press. A 25-episode anime adaptation by Gonzo aired between April and September 2009 on TV Tokyo.

A side-story manga illustrated by Aguri Igarashi, was serialized between the September 2011 and April 2013 issues of Monthly Shōnen Gangan, with an anime adaptation by Studio Gokumi airing between April and July 2012, with four additional episodes airing between December 2012 and May 2013. A third anime series, also by Studio Gokumi, aired between January and April 2014. A spin-off series to Saki, Side story of -Saki-: Shinohayu the dawn of age, began serialization in Big Gangan from September 2013. A gag manga series by Saya Kiyoshi, Saki Biyori, began serialization in Young Gangan from June 2011, with an original video animation released on July 25, 2015. Another spin-off manga illustrated by Meki Meki, Toki, began serialization in Big Gangan from June 2016. A live-action television series aired between December 2016 and January 2017, and a live-action film opened in Japan in February 2017.

Plot

Saki Miyanaga, a freshman in high school, does not like mahjong because her family would always force her to play it and punish her regardless of the outcome of the game. Due to this, she learned how to keep her score at zero, neither winning nor losing, a skill said to be more difficult than actually consistently winning. However, her friend from middle school, completely unaware of such circumstances, convinces her to visit the school's small mahjong club upon entering Kiyosumi High School. After the club discovers her ability, they recruit her permanently and convince her to win instead of breaking even. She easily does so with her skill and discovers a new love for mahjong, along with a friendship with her fellow club member, Nodoka Haramura. This leads the team to enter the prefecture's high school mahjong tournament with the goal of reaching the national high school competition.

The side-story manga, Saki: Achiga-hen episode of Side-A, is based in the area around Yoshino, Nara and follows a girl named Shizuno Takakamo, an old friend of Nodoka's, who used to be in Achiga Girls Academy's mahjong club together. A few years after the club disbanded and the two split up, Shizuno spots Nodoka on television as she makes her stride in mahjong. Wanting to see her old friend again, Shizuno decides to revive the Achiga Mahjong Club so that she can face against Nodoka in the inter-high national championships. The spin-off, Shinohayu the dawn of age, shows the childhood of the various pro mahjong players in the series, focusing on a girl named Shino Shiratsuki who enters the world of competitive mahjong to seek out her mother who disappeared one day.

Media

Manga

Written and drawn by Ritz Kobayashi, the Saki manga series is serialized in Square Enix's biweekly seinen manga magazine, Young Gangan. Serialization began on February 3, 2006. Square Enix has collected the chapters in tankōbon volumes. The first volume was released on December 25, 2006, and as of September 2022, 23 volumes have been released. Yen Press have licensed the series in English for digital release.

A 4-koma series written by Saya Kiyoshi, was serialized in Young Gangan between the June 17, 2011 and August 17, 2012 issues. It was also serialized in Big Gangan between the October 25, 2011 and March 24, 2018 issues. The first volume was released on March 24, 2012; seven volumes have been released as of March 24, 2018.

A spin-off manga series written by Kobayashi and illustrated by Aguri Igarashi, originally ran in Square Enix's Shōnen Gangan magazine between the September 2011 and April 2013 issues. It was compiled into six volumes released between March 24, 2012 and August 24, 2013. It resumed serialization on March 23, 2020 and two new volumes were added in 2021. Nine books have been published as of September 2022.

Another spin-off manga titled Side Story of Saki: Shinohayu the Dawn of Age began serialization in Big Gangan from September 25, 2013. As of September 2022 it has 15 volumes published. A spin-off of Achiga-hen illustrated by Meki Meki, began serialization in Big Gangan on June 25, 2016. There have been nine tankōbon volumes as of September 2022.

A series of parody one-shots titled , which detail the fictionalized backstory behind Kobayashi's serialization of Saki, have been written and illustrated by Hideki Owada and published in Young Gangan. Another spin-off by Meki Meki, titled , began serialization in Young Gangan on June 7, 2019 and has 3 volumes as of September 2022. Saki to Final Fantasy XIV, a manga drawn by Saya Kiyoshi in collaboration with the Final Fantasy XIV video game, will launch on Square Enix's Manga Up! app on January 22, 2021.

Anime

An anime adaptation of Saki was announced in the 24th issue of Young Gangan. The series was adapted by Gonzo, directed by Manabu Ono, and written by Tatsuhiko Urahata, From episode fifteen onwards, animation production was done by Picture Magic. On January 31, 2009, a 105-second promotional video began streaming on the anime's official website. The series aired on TV Tokyo and its affiliate stations between April 6 and September 28, 2009.

A 12-episode anime adaptation of Saki: Achiga-hen aired in Japan between April 9 and July 2, 2012. Ono and Urahata return as director and writer and animation production is done by Studio Gokumi. Four additional episodes aired on AT-X between December 24, 2012 and May 25, 2013. A short anime was included with a Blu-ray boxset released on March 18, 2015. A third Saki anime series, titled , aired 13 episodes between January 5 and April 6, 2014. Ono and Urahata again return as director and writer under Studio Gokumi. Each of the series are simulcasted by Crunchyroll. An original video animation of Saki Biyori, also animated by Studio Gokumi, was bundled with the 14th manga volume of Saki on July 25, 2015.

Music
Saki uses five pieces of theme music, two opening themes and three ending themes. Saki: Achiga-hen episode of side-A uses four pieces of theme music, two opening themes and two ending themes. Saki: The Nationals currently uses one opening theme and two ending themes, one of which has variations featuring different artists.

Opening themes
"Glossy:MMM" by Miyuki Hashimoto (Saki, episodes 2-14, ending theme of episodes 1, 25, The Nationals ep 13)
"Bloooomin'" by Little Non (Saki, episodes 15-25)
"Miracle Rush" by StylipS (Saki: Achiga-hen, episodes 2-12, ending theme of episodes 1, 16)
"TSU・BA・SA" by StylipS (Saki: Achiga-hen, episodes 13-15)
"New Sparks!" by Miyuki Hashimoto (Saki: The Nationals, episodes 2-13, ending theme of episode 1)
 by StylipS (Saki Biyori)
Ending themes
 by Kana Ueda, Ami Koshimizu, Rie Kugimiya, Ryōko Shiraishi, and Shizuka Itō (Saki, episodes 2-6, 8-9, 11-14)
 by Kana Ueda and Ami Koshimizu (Saki, episodes 7, 10, 16, 18, 22)
 by Kana Ueda, Ami Koshimizu, Rie Kugimiya, Ryōko Shiraishi, and Shizuka Itō (Saki, episodes 15, 17, 19-21, 23-24)
"Square Panic Serenade" performed by Aoi Yūki, Nao Tōyama, Kana Hanazawa, Mako and Yumi Uchiyama (Saki: Achiga-hen, episodes 2, 5-7, 12)
"Futuristic Player" by Miyuki Hashimoto (Saki: Achiga-hen, episodes 3, 4, 8-11, 14-15)
"True Gate" by Miyuki Hashimoto (Saki: The Nationals, episodes 2, 7, 9)

 by Juri Nagatsuma, Mariko Mizuno, Moe Toyota, Rina Satou, and Maaya Uchida (Saki: The Nationals, episodes 3, 8)
 by Saori Hayami, Chinatsu Akasaki, Kaori Mizuhashi, Ayumi Tsuji, and Sayaka Ohara (Saki: The Nationals, episodes 4, 6, 10)
 by Arisa Date, Haruka Yoshimura, Satsumi Matsuda, Mariko Nakatsu, and Minako Kotobuki (Saki: The Nationals, episodes 5, 12)
 by Kaori Fukuhara, Minori Chihara, Ai Shimizu, Ayuru Ōhashi, and Yuko Kaida (Saki Biyori, ep 1)

For the Achiga-hen PSP game, the opening theme is "Moment of Glory" by Miyuki Hashimoto.

Live-action

A four episode live-action television series began airing in Japan on December 4, 2016, and a live-action film debuted in Japan on February 3, 2017.

Video games
A mahjong video game was unveiled at the 2009 Tokyo International Anime Fair, and later released on April 22, 2009. Gonzo collaborated with Sega in developing the arcade mahjong video game based on the series, and it is based on the MJ4 Ver.C network mahjong game. The game includes a Saki Single Mode, where the player can play with Saki characters instead of matching-up with opponents online. Another mahjong video game was developed by Alchemist for the PlayStation Portable, and was released in March 2010 in Japan under the name Saki Portable. A sequel, Saki Achiga-hen episode of Side-A Portable, was released on August 29, 2013. Another sequel, Saki Zenkoku-hen, was released by Kaga Create on September 17, 2015 for PlayStation Vita. On December 22, 2016, Entergram re-released the game as Saki Zenkoku-hen Plus, with the latest update folded into it.

See also

References

External links
 Saki, Saki Achiga-hen episode of Side-A, and Saki Biyori official manga websites 
 Anime official website 
 Saki anime at TV Tokyo 
 

2009 anime television series debuts
2012 anime television series debuts
2014 anime television series debuts
Anime series based on manga
Gangan Comics manga
Gonzo (company)
Mahjong in anime and manga
Manga adapted into films
School life in anime and manga
Seinen manga
Square Enix franchises
Studio Gokumi
Yen Press titles
Japan-exclusive video games
PlayStation Portable games
PlayStation Portable-only games
Japanese drama films